"Wonderland" is the debut single of German model Heidi Klum. The song was written for a series of television advertisements for the German retailer Douglas. Proceeds from the single were given to a children's charity in her hometown of Bergisch Gladbach. The single was released on  iTunes Deutschland and a single released on November 17, 2006 in Germany. The single debuted in Germany at #13 position.

Charts

References

2006 debut singles
2006 songs
Warner Music Group singles